The Kazakhstan women's national basketball team represents Kazakhstan in international competitions. It is administrated by the Kazakhstan Basketball Federation.

Current roster
Roster for the 2017 FIBA Women's Asia Cup.

See also
Kazakhstan women's national under-19 basketball team
Kazakhstan women's national under-17 basketball team

External links
Official website
FIBA profile
Archived records of Kazakhstan team participations
Kazakhstan Women's Basketball at Asia-basket.com

References

 
Women's national basketball teams
 
national